Grindstone Road is a 2008 Canadian horror-thriller written by Paul Germann and directed by Melanie Orr.

Plot

A family moves to a farmhouse after their son is involved in a horrendous car crash that leave him in a long-term coma. Once in the new house dark events begin to occur.

Cast

References

External links

2008 direct-to-video films
2008 horror films
2008 independent films
2000s mystery horror films
2008 psychological thriller films
English-language Canadian films
Canadian direct-to-video films
Canadian horror thriller films
Canadian independent films
Canadian mystery films
Direct-to-video horror films
Direct-to-video thriller films
Films about child abuse
Films shot in Ontario
Canadian ghost films
2000s psychological horror films
2000s mystery thriller films
2008 films
2000s English-language films
2000s Canadian films